The Twenty-sixth Amendment of the Constitution Act 2002 (previously bill no. 32 of 2003) is an amendment of the Constitution of Ireland which permitted the state to ratify the Treaty of Nice. It was approved by referendum on 19 October 2002 (sometimes known as the second Nice referendum) and signed into law on 7 November of the same year. The amendment followed a previous failed attempt to approve the Nice Treaty which was rejected in the first Nice referendum held in 2001.

Background
The Treaty of Nice was signed by the member states of the European Union in February 2001, amending the Treaties of the European Union. Under the decision of the Supreme Court in Crotty v. An Taoiseach (1987), an amendment to the Constitution was required before it could be ratified by Ireland. In June 2001, an amendment to the Constitution of to allow the ratification of the Nice Treaty was rejected in a referendum. One of the reasons the No side had called for its rejection was that it would affect Irish neutrality. When the Nice Treaty was put to a second vote, the wording of the constitutional amendment excluded participation in common defence. The Treaty of Nice contained a number of optional discretionary provisions that member-states could activate at a later time after its adoption. The Government of Ireland and the European Council jointly made the Seville Declarations on the Treaty of Nice in June 2002 to recommit themselves to shared interests ahead of the second vote. The Twenty-sixth Amendment permitted the Republic to choose to exercise these options, provided its decision was approved by the Oireachtas.

Changes to the text
Insertion of the following subsections in Article 29.4:

Existing subsections 7º and 8º of Article 29.4 renumbered as 10º and 11º respectively.

Oireachtas debate
The Twenty-sixth Amendment of the Constitution Bill was proposed in Dáil Éireann by Minister for Foreign Affairs Brian Cowen on 4 September 2002 on behalf of the Fianna Fáil–Progressive Democrats coalition government led by Taoiseach Bertie Ahern. It passed final stages in the Dáil on 11 September, where it also had the support of Fine Gael and the Labour Party, and was opposed by Sinn Féin, the Green Party and the Socialist Party and a number of Independent TDs. It passed final stages in Seanad Éireann on 13 September and proceeded to a referendum on 19 October.

Campaign
A Referendum Commission was established by Minister for the Environment and Local Government Noel Dempsey. It was chaired by former Chief Justice Thomas Finlay. Its role was to prepare one or more statements containing a general explanation of the subject matter of the proposal and of the text of the proposal in the amendment bill.

Result

The '± Yes 2001' column shows the percentage point change in the Yes vote compared to the first Nice referendum which was rejected in a referendum in 2001.

Note on numbering
The Twenty-sixth Amendment follows directly after the Twenty-third Amendment in the list of passed Amendments. This is because the Twenty-fourth and Twenty-fifth Amendment of the Constitution Bills were both rejected in referendums, and the government decided not to reuse the numbers. Numbers have been re-used before, for example, there were rejected proposals titled the Third Amendment in 1959 and in 1968, before the Third Amendment of the Constitution of Ireland was passed in 1972.

See also
Politics of the Republic of Ireland
History of the Republic of Ireland
Twenty-eighth Amendment of the Constitution of Ireland (Permission to ratify the Treaty of Lisbon).

References

External links
Twenty-sixth Amendment of the Constitution Act 2002
Oireachtas Debates: Twenty-sixth Amendment of the Constitution Bill 2002
Full text of the Constitution of Ireland

2002 in international relations
2002 in Irish law
2002 in Irish politics
2002 referendums
26
Ireland Amendments of the Constitution
Ireland and the European Union
26
Ireland, 26
October 2002 events in Europe
Amendment, 26